The Glebe House, built in 1854–1857, is a historic house with an octagon-shaped wing in Arlington County, Virginia.  The Northern Virginia Conservation Trust holds a conservation easement to help protect and preserve it. The name of the house comes from the property's history as a glebe, an area of land within an ecclesiastical parish used to support a parish priest. In this case, the glebe was established by the Church of England before the American Revolutionary War.

A historical marker that the Arlington County government erected near the house in 1969 states that the glebe was a  farm that was: 
... provided for the rector of Fairfax Parish, which included both Christ Church, Alexandria, and the Falls Church. The Glebe House, built in 1775, stood here. It burned in 1808 and was rebuilt in 1820, as a hunting lodge; the octagon wing was added about 1850. Distinguished persons who have occupied the house include the Rev. Bryan Fairfax (8th Lord Fairfax), John Peter Van Ness (Mayor of Washington), Clark Mills (sculptor), Caleb Cushing (first U.S. Minister to China), and Frank Ball (state senator).
 
The house is listed on the Virginia Landmarks Register by the Virginia Department of Historic Resources, with number 000-0003. The National Park Service listed the house on the National Register of Historic Places on February 23, 1972. The Arlington County Board designated the building to be a local historic district on January 7, 1984.

The house is located near Glebe Road (Virginia State Route 120), a major road through Arlington County, which also takes its name from the historic glebe lands of Fairfax Parish.

See also
 Glebe
 Cushing House Museum and Garden, Newburyport, Massachusetts — a National Historic Landmark and another home of diplomat Caleb Cushing
 Caleb Cushing House and Farm, Rehoboth, Massachusetts
 List of Arlington County Historic Districts

References

External links
Northern Virginia Conservation Trust

Houses in Arlington County, Virginia
Arlington County Historic Districts
Octagon houses in Virginia
Houses completed in 1815
Houses on the National Register of Historic Places in Virginia
National Register of Historic Places in Arlington County, Virginia